Lewis James McMahon (born 2 May 1985) is an English semi-professional footballer who plays as a midfielder for Australian Football West Premier League club Floreat Athena.

He has previously played for Sheffield Wednesday, Notts County, York City, Gainsborough Trinity, Matlock Town and North Ferriby United.

Club career

Sheffield Wednesday
Born in Doncaster, South Yorkshire, McMahon started his career with Sheffield Wednesday. Signed as a trainee, he made his first senior start playing the full ninety minutes in a South Yorkshire Derby against Second Division rivals Barnsley on 13 March 2004 at Hillsborough in front of 25,664 supporters. The results was a 2–1 victory with Guylain Ndumbu-Nsungu grabbing both goals either side of half time. He continued to make eight more starting appearances that season and also make two as a substitute. Next season, McMahon made 17 more appearances and scored his first two senior goals, the first of which was a drive against Blackpool to gain a 2–1 win and the first points of the season. However, McMahon was released by Wednesday at the end of the 2004–05 season.

Notts County
McMahon was signed by Notts County on a one-year deal in July 2005 following his release by Sheffield Wednesday. McMahon left County at the end of 2005–06.

York City
McMahon was signed by Conference National club York City on 18 August 2006 after he left Notts County. He was released by York at the end of 2006–07. Following his release, McMahon said: "We did have a good team but, towards the back half of the season, if anyone went to see me playing for the reserves they will have seen me stand out. I was scoring quite a few goals and doing really well. I also lost a stone in weight and did everything the gaffer asked of me so I was a bit gutted not to get a chance to do it in the first team."

Gainsborough Trinity
McMahon joined Conference North club Gainsborough Trinity on 23 July 2007. On 25 February 2012, McMahon joined Northern Premier League Premier Division club Matlock Town on a one-month loan. He returned to Trinity and was an unused substitute in the club's play-off matches, which saw them lose in the final to Nuneaton Town. He was released by Trinity in May 2012.

Matlock Town
McMahon signed for Matlock permanently on 27 June 2012, and was their top scorer in 2012–13 with 24 goals. He returned to Gainsborough on a one-month loan on 22 November 2013, and scored five goals from five matches.

Later career
McMahon joined Conference North club North Ferriby United on 7 February 2014. He was an unused substitute in their play-off semi-final matches, but played as a substitute in the 5–2 win over Bridlington Town in the East Riding Senior Cup final on 13 May 2014. McMahon moved to Australia and signed for Australian Football West Premier League club Floreat Athena later in 2014.

International career
McMahon was called up to the England national C team for their match against Malta in February 2009. He started the match as captain, before being substituted in the 46th minute, as England won 4–0.

Career statistics

References

External links

1985 births
Living people
Footballers from Doncaster
English footballers
English expatriate footballers
England semi-pro international footballers
Association football midfielders
Sheffield Wednesday F.C. players
Notts County F.C. players
York City F.C. players
Gainsborough Trinity F.C. players
Matlock Town F.C. players
North Ferriby United A.F.C. players
Floreat Athena FC players
English Football League players
National League (English football) players
Northern Premier League players
Expatriate soccer players in Australia
English expatriate sportspeople in Australia